Real Life is the debut studio album by Australian singer and songwriter, Marie Wilson. It was released in October 1998, peaking at number 7 on the ARIA Charts.

At the ARIA Music Awards of 1999, the album was nominated for the Award for Breakthrough Artist – Album.

Critical reception

Heather Phares from AllMusic said "[Wilson's] passionate vocals and lyrics lend themselves to unvarnished acoustic numbers as well as straight-ahead rock, with samples and loops mixed in for good measure."

Track listing
 "Won't Keep a Good Girl Down"	- 3:25
 "Next Time"	- 4:24
 "Real Life" - 3:48
 "Making It Up As I Go Along" - 4:13
 "On My Own" - 4:25
 "Rescue Me" - 3:49
 "Without My Lover" - 5:17
 "Ordinary Girl" - 3:16
 "Take Me As I Am" - 4:05
 "Impossible" - 4:18
 "Runaway" - 4:31

Charts

References

1998 debut albums
Warner Records albums